David James Webb (born 9 April 1946) is an English former professional footballer who made 555 appearances in the Football League playing for Leyton Orient, Southampton, Chelsea, Queens Park Rangers, Leicester City, Derby County, AFC Bournemouth and Torquay United. He became a manager, taking charge of Bournemouth, Torquay United, Southend United, Chelsea, Brentford and Yeovil Town.

Playing career

Leyton Orient and Southampton
David Webb was born in Stratford (then in Essex) and began his career as an amateur with West Ham United, but on failing to make the grade joined Leyton Orient in May 1963. His league debut came in the 1964–65 season, launching what would be a long career in league football. In March 1966, after 62 games (3 goals) for Orient, he moved to Southampton, with George O'Brien going in the opposite direction. He scored twice in 75 games for the Saints, including a goal on his debut to equalise in a vital 1–1 draw at promotion rivals Wolverhampton Wanderers, before joining Chelsea in February 1968.

Chelsea
It was with Chelsea that Webb really made his name in football, in particular for his role in Chelsea's win in the 1970 FA Cup final against Leeds United at Old Trafford. During the first game at Wembley, Webb, playing at right-back, had a nightmare and was tormented throughout the match by the nimble and tricky Leeds winger Eddie Gray as Chelsea were somewhat fortunate to emerge with a 2–2 draw. Manager Dave Sexton made a tactical switch for the replay, moving Webb to the centre to partner John Dempsey while the more uncompromising Ron Harris was detailed to mark Gray. Webb – and Chelsea overall – performed markedly better in the replay and it was he who proved the unlikely hero, heading in the winner from an Ian Hutchinson throw-in in extra time.

The following year Chelsea beat Real Madrid in another replay to win the European Cup Winners Cup. Although he spent much of his Chelsea career as a right back, he also played in central defence (his original position) and occasionally as a centre forward, once hitting a hat-trick against Ipswich Town in December 1968. He wore every shirt from 1 to 12 at Chelsea, except number 11. Ipswich were once again witness to his versatility when he played as a goalkeeper for an entire match, on 27 December 1971, keeping a clean sheet in the process, and then scored two goals in the return fixture as a centre forward in March 1972.

After Chelsea
He finally left Chelsea in July 1974, having scored 21 times in 230 games, joining Queens Park Rangers for £120,000. In February 1975, Webb sensationally announced his retirement from the game after just a few months with his new club. However, just a week later, he asked to return to the club, having resolved a number of personal business issues, with assistance from close friend Terry Venables. Webb then concentrated on football, helping Rangers to the runners-up spot in the Football League in the 1975–76 season, their best ever league position. Seven goals in 116 games for Rangers were followed by a £50,000 move to Leicester City in September 1977. He stayed just over a year at Filbert Street, playing 33 games for the Foxes before joining Derby County in December 1978, his Derby debut coming on 23 December in a goalless draw at home to Aston Villa. He left the Baseball Ground in May 1980, after 26 games for the Rams (1 goal), joining AFC Bournemouth.

Managerial career

AFC Bournemouth
He played only 11 times for Bournemouth, but in December 1980 was appointed manager, guiding them to promotion to the third division in 1982. He held the position until 10 February 1982, when he was sacked after a dispute with the chairman over new ownership of the club.

Torquay United
In February 1984, after a spell out of the game working as a self-employed salesman, he was appointed manager of Torquay United in succession to Bruce Rioch. At the end of the 1983–84 season, Torquay finished in 9th place and were looking to progress. The following season they finished bottom and Webb himself was forced out of retirement, scoring once in his 2 league appearances that season. On 21 August 1985, Webb became managing director at Torquay, appointing first John Sims and then Stuart Morgan to manage the team. Torquay finished bottom again the following season. His spell in charge is not fondly remembered, the team had two disastrous seasons; five of United's better players were released as soon as he took over, others such as Keith Curle were sold cheaply, and replaced by vastly inferior players, and the club colours changed to blue..

Southend United
Webb left Torquay to manage Southend United on 17 June 1986. He left Southend in March 1987, just two months before they won promotion to the Third Division. He was re-appointed in November 1988 but couldn't save the club from relegation back to the Fourth Division. He guided Southend to promotion from the old Fourth Division in 1990 and from the Third Division a year later. They briefly topped the Second Division in January 1992 but fell away to mid-table during the final weeks of the season, Webb having resigned in March 1992 and leaving the club at the end of the season.

Chelsea
Webb returned to Chelsea as interim manager in February 1993 on a short-term contract to replace Ian Porterfield. The club was in freefall, without a league win in over two months and threatened with relegation. Under Webb, performances and results gradually improved and the team eventually finished a comfortable 11th in the Premiership. But the club's board did not renew his contract and appointed Glenn Hoddle instead.

Brentford
Webb returned to the game within days, taking the manager's job at Brentford, who had just been relegated to Division Two, in May 1993. After two play-off appearances had failed to get them back into Division One, Webb acquired an ownership stake in the club and resigned as manager. Webb sold the club to Ron Noades in June 1998, following protests from supporters about his running of the club, and their relegation to Division Three

Yeovil Town and back to Southend United
In March 2000 he took over as manager of Yeovil Town, but resigned in September 2000 to take over at Southend United again. He left Southend in October 2001, but returned again, as caretaker manager, in November 2003, in between Steve Wignall leaving and Steve Tilson taking over.

Webb bought Yeovil Town from Jon Goddard-Watts in December 2005, taking over the role of Chief Executive. He resigned from this position in February 2006 and has since sold his shares to chairman John Fry.

He was appointed assistant to the manager at Southend in March 2010 until the end of the 2009–10 season after taking over from Paul Brush.

Personal life
Webb's son Daniel also became a professional footballer. He also two adopted children.

References

External links

1946 births
Living people
Footballers from Stratford, London
English footballers
Association football fullbacks
Premier League managers
West Ham United F.C. players
Leyton Orient F.C. players
Southampton F.C. players
Chelsea F.C. players
Queens Park Rangers F.C. players
Leicester City F.C. players
Derby County F.C. players
AFC Bournemouth players
AFC Bournemouth managers
Torquay United F.C. players
Torquay United F.C. managers
Southend United F.C. managers
Chelsea F.C. managers
Brentford F.C. managers
Yeovil Town F.C. managers
Outfield association footballers who played in goal
English football managers
FA Cup Final players